Kenneth Franklin McKenzie Jr. (born 1956 or 1957) is a retired United States Marine Corps general who served as the 14th commander of the United States Central Command from March 28, 2019 to April 1, 2022. He served as Director of the Joint Staff from July 5, 2017 after having previously served for two years as Director of Strategic Plans and Policy (J-5) on the Joint Staff.

Early life and education
A native of Birmingham, Alabama, McKenzie was commissioned in 1979 via the Naval Reserve Officers Training Corps at The Citadel. McKenzie holds a Master's degree in History from the National Defense University and has served as a Senior Military Fellow at the school's Institute for National Strategic Studies. He is an Honors Graduate of the Marine Corps Command and Staff College and the School of Advanced Warfighting.

Military career
As an infantry officer McKenzie's assignments have included command of the 1st Battalion, 6th Marines as Commanding Officer of the 22nd Marine Expeditionary Unit, which he led on deployments to both Iraq and Afghanistan. He also served as Military Secretary to two Commandants of the Marine Corps.

McKenzie's general officer posts have included Deputy Director of Operations for the National Military Command Center in the Pentagon. In 2008 he was selected by the Chairman of the Joint Chiefs of Staff to serve as Director of his new administration transition team, overseeing the transition of military forces under incoming President Barack Obama. He returned to Afghanistan serving as Deputy Chief of Staff for Stability under the International Security Assistance Force, followed by a tour as Director of Strategy, Plans and Policy at United States Central Command. He then returned to the Pentagon to serve as the Marine Corps Representative to the Quadrennial Defense Review and, after receiving his third star, was appointed Commanding General of United States Marine Forces Central Command.

As CENTCOM commander, McKenzie oversaw the successful high-profile special forces raid in Syria to kill or capture then-Islamic State leader Abu Bakr al-Baghdadi in October 2019, and the 2020–2021 withdrawals and reductions of U.S. troops from Iraq.

During the 2020–2021 Afghanistan withdrawal, McKenzie replaced General Austin "Scott" Miller as leader of U.S. and NATO forces in Afghanistan upon the latter's resignation on July 12, 2021, with Miller's departure perceived by some as "the symbolic end of the U.S. military mission in Afghanistan." One month later, McKenzie was responsible for the August 2021 Kabul drone strike which targeted and killed civilians, 7 children and 3 adults.

McKenzie retired from active duty on 1 April 2022, after relinquishing command of CENTCOM to General Michael Kurilla.

Awards and decorations

General McKenzie earned several awards of the Rifle Expert Badge as well as the Pistol Sharpshooter Badge.

Effective dates of promotion

References

External links

U.S. Central Command Biography

1950s births
Living people
United States Marine Corps generals
United States Marine Corps personnel of the Iraq War
United States Marine Corps personnel of the War in Afghanistan (2001–2021)
Military personnel from Birmingham, Alabama
The Citadel, The Military College of South Carolina alumni
Recipients of the Defense Distinguished Service Medal
Recipients of the Defense Superior Service Medal
Recipients of the Legion of Merit
Recipients of the Meritorious Service Medal (United States)